Ocean Parkway is a  boulevard in the west-central portion of the New York City borough of Brooklyn. It is inventoried by the New York State Department of Transportation (NYSDOT) as New York State Route 908H (NY 908H), an unsigned reference route.

Route description
Ocean Parkway extends over a distance of about five miles (8 km), running almost north to south from Machate Circle at the southwestern corner of Prospect Park to the Atlantic Ocean waterfront at Brighton Beach. The NYSDOT designates the  section south of Church Avenue as an unsigned reference route.

Ocean Parkway begins at Machate Circle at the southern entrance of Prospect Park and travels westward before merging south into Prospect Expressway. After the expressway ends at Church Avenue, then passes through Windsor Terrace and what is present-day Kensington. The parkway runs roughly parallel to Coney Island Avenue, an important commercial avenue several blocks to the east. After running through several neighborhoods such as Midwood, Homecrest, and Sheepshead Bay, the parkway ends at Surf Avenue in Brighton Beach, close to the Riegelmann Boardwalk and ocean.

The parkway is similar to Eastern Parkway in its layout. It includes a  central seven-lane roadway (the middle lane being used for left turns), two  grassy medians on each side with bike and pedestrian paths, two  service roads on the periphery, and two  exterior sidewalks, for a total width of 210 feet (64 m). The Brooklyn Parks Commission initially controlled another  to each side. According to the original legislation, the medians could only be used for trees, plazas, and other ornamentation. As such, trees, playing tables, and benches line the pedestrian path and boulevard. A bike lane is located on the western median.  The parkway parallels the New York City Subway's Culver Line and Brighton Line from the Belt Parkway to Church Avenue.

History
Frederick Law Olmsted and Calvert Vaux, who were also responsible for designing Central Park and Prospect Park, suggested the construction of Eastern Parkway and Ocean Parkway to Brooklyn park commissioners in reports prepared in 1866. The proposed Ocean and Eastern Parkways would connect Prospect Park with Coney Island and East New York, respectively. Their plan for the parkways were inspired by boulevards such as Under den Linden in Berlin and Avenue Foch in Paris. However, Ocean and Eastern Parkways were considered to be improvements over these two thoroughfares, since both would contain service roads separated from the main road by tree-lined medians. Because the road to Coney Island would reach the ocean, it was thus called "Ocean Parkway".
On May 11, 1869, the New York State Legislature gave authority to the City of Brooklyn's commissioners to "lay out, open, and improve a public highway or avenue from Prospect Park, in the City of Brooklyn, towards Coney Island." The act was later amended in 1872. The parkway's construction started in 1874, and the next year, the segment was open between Prospect Park and Kings Highway. The remaining section to Coney Island started in "early spring" 1876 and was finished on November 11 of that year. Construction costs were paid by landowners whose property laid  on either side of the parkway. The costs at the time were estimated as being $1 million, with the section north of Kings Highway accounting for three-fourths of the cost. Subsequent legislation passed in 1882 relieved these landowners of two-thirds of that cost.

The Prospect Expressway, built in the 1950s, replaced the northernmost half-mile of the parkway. By the 1970s, there were calls both to renew Ocean Parkway and to make it into a landmark. After a short controversy over whether such a landmark was eligible for federal funds, the parkway was designated a landmark by the city in 1975. Afterward, Ocean Parkway was restored and repaved. The Special Ocean Parkway District was designated by the city in 1978, and the reconstruction was completed two years later.

In 2013, the New York state government allocated $6 million for safety improvements to Ocean Parkway. In 2016, an overhaul of traffic regulations at major intersections was proposed, including traffic signals for service roads and turn restrictions at multiple intersections. The regulations were unpopular among residents but went into effect at Kings Highway and Avenue J in late 2016. The project was finished in 2017, though some motorists ignored the new traffic restrictions.

Horseback riding 
Bridle paths formerly existed on Ocean Parkway as well. The bridle paths were on the eastern side of Ocean Parkway; equestrians could rent horses near Prospect Park and ride them on Ocean Parkway as far as Coney Island. In the parkway's early years, horse and sleigh racing took place on the bridle paths. Both the Gravesend Race Track and Brighton Beach Race Course were adjacent to Ocean Parkway, and horse racing took place there as well. In 1908 or 1910, a ban on open betting took effect, and horse races stopped at all of these facilities.

By the mid-20th century, horseback riding in Brooklyn was in decline as people switched to automobiles, and equestrian activities became more of a hobby. These paths were removed during the 1978 rezoning. Although one can still rent horses at the nearby Kensington Stables, the bridle paths on Ocean Parkway have since been paved over and are no longer in use. Another stable, at Avenue S and Coney Island Avenue, was removed.

Neighborhood 

Much of Ocean Parkway is zoned for mid-to-high rise residential structures. Around 1900, homes were constructed along the perimeter of the parkway, and during World War I, many mansions were built. Buyers came to Ocean Parkway from Bedford-Stuyvesant, Brooklyn Heights, and Bushwick. In the 1920s, apartment complexes and one- and two-family homes were constructed; the northernmost portion of the parkway became the site of luxurious, elevator-equipped apartment buildings. Apartments began to replace older homes in the vicinity of the parkway after World War II. Since the 1978 designation of the Special Ocean Parkway District, new developments on Ocean Parkway must comply with several regulations. In particular, these developments must have a  "landscaped front yard unobstructed by porches, canopies or stairs". Paving is not permitted except on driveways and walkways. In addition, there are several schools along the parkway, such as Abraham Lincoln High School at the intersection with Shore Parkway and Mir Yeshiva at the intersection with Avenue R.

By the 1970s, the neighborhoods around Ocean Parkway had the highest concentrations of Syrian Jews in the United States. In 1980, it was estimated that 60 to 70 percent of the population was Syrian Jewish. This was reflected in the high density of synagogues, yeshivas, and other traditionally Jewish institutions around Ocean Parkway.

Transportation
The New York City Subway's BMT Brighton Line serves the Ocean Parkway station in Brighton Beach. The B1, B4 and B36 travel on the parkway in Sheepshead Bay and the B9 travels on the parkway for one block in Midwood.

Major intersections

Gallery

See also

References

External links

 

Bike paths in New York City
Brighton Beach
Gravesend, Brooklyn
National Register of Historic Places in Brooklyn
National Register of Historic Places in New York City
Neighborhoods in Brooklyn
New York City Designated Landmarks in Brooklyn
New York City scenic landmarks
Parks in Brooklyn
Parks on the National Register of Historic Places in New York City
Parkways in New York City
Roads on the National Register of Historic Places in New York (state)
Streets in Brooklyn